"Bloom" is a song by South Korean recording artist Gain, from her second extended play Talk About S. It was written by Kim Eana, arranged and composed by Lee Min-soo. The song was released digitally as the lead single from the EP on October 5, 2012, by LOEN Entertainment.

A modern dance-pop song with funk influences, "Bloom" talks about the delightful and positive feelings of a girl while experiencing sex for the first time. Upon its release, "Bloom" was met with positive reviews from music critics and has been included in several publications K-pop best-of lists.

Release
The video teaser for "Bloom" was released on October 4, 2012, through LOEN Entertainment's official YouTube channel. The song and its corresponding music video were released online, along with the whole extended play, on the following day.

Accolades
"Bloom" received nominations for several awards, including Best Pop Song at the 10th Korean Music Awards and Best Music Video at the 2012 Mnet Asian Music Awards. Due to its success on digital platforms, it won Song of the Year (October) at the 2nd Gaon Chart Music Awards.	 It additionally received a music program award on Mnet's M Countdown on October 18, 2012.

Chart performance

Weekly charts

Monthly charts

Year-end charts

Sales

Release history

References

External links
 
 

2012 singles
2012 songs
Songs with lyrics by Kim Eana
Gain (singer) songs